What Makes Us Glow is the fourth album by electronica band Psapp. On Monday 16 September 2013, announced that their fourth album "What Makes Us Glow" will be released on 11 November through The state51 Conspiracy.

Track listing

Personnel

Psapp

Carim Clasmann
Galia Durant

Notes

External links
Psapp official website

2013 albums
Psapp albums